Mongoose R.I.P. is a 1988 Blackford Oakes novel by William F. Buckley, Jr. It is the eighth of 11 novels in the series.

Plot
CIA agent Blackford Oakes is sent to Cuba to determine the feasibility of overthrowing Fidel Castro, following the Cuban Missile Crisis in 1963.

References

1987 American novels
Blackford Oakes novels
Novels set in Cuba
Random House books